Surendra Narayan Singh is an Indian politician and a member of 17th Legislative Assembly, Uttar Pradesh of India. He represents the Bairia constituency of Uttar Pradesh. He is  member of the Vikashsheel Insan Party.

Political career
Surendra Narayan Singh  has been a member of the 17th Legislative Assembly of Uttar Pradesh. Since 2017, he has represented the Rohaniya  constituency and is a member of the Vikassheel Insaan Party. Surendra Narayan Singh defeated Mahendra Singh Patel  of Samajwadi Party with a margin of 57,553 votes in Uttar Pradesh assembly elections held in 2017. He was jila panchayat sadsya and gram pradhan before becoming an MLA.

On 6 February 2018, Singh and his supporters blocked a road near Rameshwar for hours in protest of police failing to take action against trucks passing through the road despite being banned.

Posts held

References

People from Varanasi district
Bharatiya Janata Party politicians from Uttar Pradesh
Living people
Uttar Pradesh MLAs 2017–2022
Year of birth missing (living people)